Mahonia fordii is a species of shrub in the Berberidaceae described as a species in 1913. It is endemic to China, found in Chongqing and Guangdong Provinces.

References

fordii
Endemic flora of China
Plants described in 1913